Muhammad Safwan bin Mazlan (born 22 February 2000) is a Malaysian professional footballer who plays primarily as a left-back for Malaysia Super League club Terengganu.

Career statistics

Club

References

External links
 

2000 births
Living people
People from Terengganu
Malaysian footballers
Terengganu F.C. II players
Terengganu FC players
Malaysia Super League players
Malaysian people of Malay descent
Association football defenders